Raili Kauppi (1920–1995), professor of philosophy at the University of Tampere. She was an internationally recognized scholar of Leibniz and intensional logic.

Main publications:
 Über die Leibnizsche Logik mit besonderer Berücksichtigung des Problems der Intension und Extension, Acta Philosophia Fennica, Fasc. XII, Helsinki, 1960.
 Einführung in die Theorie der Begriffsysteme, Acta Universitatis Tamperensis, Ser A, vol 15, Tampere, 1967.

1920 births
1995 deaths
Writers from Helsinki
Finnish women philosophers
20th-century Finnish philosophers